Viadana may refer to:

Surname
 Lodovico Grossi da Viadana (c. 1560 – 1627), Italian composer, teacher, and Franciscan friar
 Gilberto Viadana (born 1973), Italian figure skater

Other
 Viadana, Lombardy, a town in the province of Mantua, Lombardy, northern Italy
 Viadana Rugby, a rugby union club based in the town
 Viadana (insect), an insect in family Tettigoniidae